Below is a list of covered bridges in Illinois. There are nine authentic covered bridges in the U.S. state of Illinois. Five of them are historic.  A covered bridge is considered authentic not due to its age, but by its construction. An authentic bridge is constructed using trusses rather than other methods such as stringers, a popular choice for non-authentic covered bridges.

Bridges

See also

 List of bridges on the National Register of Historic Places in Illinois
 List of covered bridges in the United States
 World Guide to Covered Bridges

References

External links

 National Society for the Preservation of Covered Bridges
 Only in Your State article about the state's covered bridges

Illinois
 
covered bridges
Bridges, covered